Elton Aparecido de Souza (born 9 May 1985 in Campinas), or simply Elton, is a Brazilian striker who last played for Slavia Sofia.

Elton's previous club was Pogoń Szczecin in Ekstraklasa, which he was signed on March 7, 2006. In his country, he played for Ginásio Pinhalense-SP, A.C. Guacuano and Atlético de Sorocaba.

External links
 Brazilian FA Database

1985 births
Living people
Brazilian footballers
Brazilian expatriate footballers
Clube Atlético Sorocaba players
PFC Slavia Sofia players
Expatriate footballers in Bulgaria
Expatriate footballers in Poland
First Professional Football League (Bulgaria) players
Sportspeople from Campinas
Brazilian expatriate sportspeople in Bulgaria
Brazilian expatriate sportspeople in Poland
Association football forwards